Tetragonopterus is a genus of fish in the family Characidae native to South America.

Species
There are currently 12 recognized species of this genus:
 Tetragonopterus anostomus G. S. C. Silva & Benine, 2011 
 Tetragonopterus araguaiensis G. S. C. Silva, B. F. Melo, C. de Oliveira & Benine, 2013 
 Tetragonopterus argenteus G. Cuvier, 1816 
 Tetragonopterus carvalhoi B. F. Melo, Benine, Mariguela & C. de Oliveira, 2011 
 Tetragonopterus chalceus Agassiz, 1829 
 Tetragonopterus denticulatus G. S. C. Silva, B. F. Melo, C. de Oliveira & Benine, 2013 
 Tetragonopterus franciscoensis G. S. C. Silva, B. F. Melo, C. de Oliveira & Benine, 2016 
 Tetragonopterus georgiae (Géry, 1965) 
 Tetragonopterus juruena G. S. C. Silva, B. F. Melo, C. de Oliveira & Benine, 2016 
 Tetragonopterus kuluene G. S. C. Silva, B. F. Melo, C. de Oliveira & Benine, 2016 
 Tetragonopterus ommatus G. S. C. Silva, B. F. Melo, C. de Oliveira & Benine, 2016 
 Tetragonopterus rarus (Zarske, Géry & Isbrücker, 2004)

References

Characidae
Fish of South America
Freshwater fish genera
Taxa named by Georges Cuvier